This following is the discography of the band Roxy Music.

Albums

Studio albums

Live albums

Compilation albums

Box sets

EPs

Video albums

Singles

Notes

References

External links

Discographies of British artists
Pop music group discographies